Songs from a Secret Garden is the first international album by Secret Garden. Released in 1996, it includes the Norwegian winning song of the Eurovision Song Contest 1995, "Nocturne".

Reception 
The Allmusic reviewer Carol Wright awarded the album 4 stars, and it achieved platinum awards in Norway and South Korea. It stayed on the Billboard New Age chart for 101 weeks.

The track "Song from a Secret Garden" became famous in Korea by being featured in the drama 젊은이의 양지 (which means "Sunny Spots (or Places) of the Young") in 1995 and was also used in the 2018 Italian drama film Vittima della mia libertà ("Victim of my freedom") by Davide Guida. Another track from the album, "Adagio", was featured in the 2004 Wong Kar-wai film 2046. Another 1997 Hong Kong ATV drama 天長地久("Fated Love") also featured several tracks from this album, including "Song from a Secret Garden", "Adagio", "Serenade to Spring" and "Papillon".

The title track was covered by Greek melodic death metal band Nightrage in 2019 and included as a Japanese bonus track on Wolf to Man.

Track listing 
All songs and arrangements by Rolf Løvland, except where noted

In Korea
In Korea, "Serenade to Spring" was given a lyric and is sung under the name of "10월의 어느 멋진 날에" which means "One Fine Day in October". A popular baritone in Korea, Kim Dong-kyu sang the song on TV and a few professional singers sung in duo.

Republish 
In December 2010, Universal Music Group started to publish this album again in K2HD CD format by technology of K2HD by JVC. Since 100 kHz 24bit sound signal is processed during remastering by K2HD technology, high frequency is highlighted, especially in the better sound quality of violin.

Personnel 
Fionnuala Sherry – Violin
Rolf Løvland – Piano & keyboards
Des Moore – Guitar & mandolin
Andrea Marlish – Harp
Bjørn Ole Rasch & Jon Kjell Seljeseth – Additional keyboards
Davy Spillane – Bagpipes (Uilleann pipe) & low whistle (tracks: 2, 4, 7, 10 & 11)
Hans Fredrik Jacobsen – Whistle & Norwegian whistle (tracks: 1, 6, 7 & 10)
Asa Jinder – Keyfiddle & keyharp (tracks: 1, 7 & 10)
David Agnew – Oboe, English Horn (tracks: 3, 9 & 11)
Rhonan Sugrue – Soprano Vocals (boy) (track: 4)
Gunnhild Tvinnereim – Vocals (track: 1)
Deirdre Brady – Flute (track: 5)
Jean Lechmar – Clarinet (track: 12)
Noel Eccles – Percussion (track: 10)
Irish National Chamber Choir – Choir (track: 4)
RTÉ Concert Orchestra – Orchestra

Credits 
Scott Townsend – Cover design
Conal Markey & Conan Doyle – Assistant engineer
Andrew Boland – Recording engineer
Oskar P. Sveinsson – Recording engineer & mixing
David Agnew (track: 4) & Petter Skavlan (track: 1) – Lyrics
Erik Avnskog & Jan Erik Kongshaug – Mixing
John Tate – Additional Orchestra Conductor
Mick Hales – Cover photography – Mick Hales
Rolf Løvland – Producer, arranger, conductor & mixing

Notes 
℗ 1995 PolyGram A/S Norway

Charts

Weekly charts

Year-end charts

Certifications

References

External links 
Listen demo album Songs from a Secret Garden

1995 albums
Secret Garden (duo) albums